Inanna is an ancient Mesopotamian goddess of love, beauty, war, and fertility. She is also associated with sex, divine law, and political power. She was originally worshiped in Sumer under the name "Inanna", and later by the Akkadians, Babylonians, and Assyrians under the name Ishtar (and occasionally the logogram ). She was known as "the Queen of Heaven" and was the patron goddess of the Eanna temple at the city of Uruk, which was her early main cult center. She was associated with the planet Venus and her most prominent symbols included the lion and the eight-pointed star. Her husband was the god Dumuzid (later known as Tammuz) and her , or personal attendant, was the goddess Ninshubur (who later became conflated with the male deities Ilabrat and Papsukkal).

Inanna was worshiped in Sumer at least as early as the Uruk period, but she had little cult activity before the conquest of Sargon of Akkad. During the post-Sargonic era, she became one of the most widely venerated deities in the Sumerian pantheon, with temples across Mesopotamia. The cult of Inanna / Ishtar, which may have been associated with a variety of sexual rites, was continued by the East Semitic-speaking people (Akkadians, Assyrians and Babylonians) who succeeded and absorbed the Sumerians in the region.

She was especially beloved by the Assyrians, who elevated her to become the highest deity in their pantheon, ranking above their own national god Ashur. Inanna / Ishtar is alluded to in the Hebrew Bible and she greatly influenced the Ugaritic Ashtart and later Phoenician Astarte, who in turn possibly influenced the development of the Greek goddess Aphrodite. Her cult continued to flourish until its gradual decline between the first and sixth centuries CE in the wake of Christianity.

Inanna appears in more myths than any other Sumerian deity. She also had a uniquely high number of epithets and alternate names, comparable only to Nergal.

Many of her myths involve her taking over the domains of other deities. She was also believed to have taken over the Eanna temple from An, the god of the sky. Alongside her twin brother Utu (later known as Shamash), Inanna was the enforcer of divine justice; she destroyed Mount Ebih for having challenged her authority, unleashed her fury upon the gardener Shukaletuda after he raped her in her sleep, and tracked down the bandit woman Bilulu and killed her in divine retribution for having murdered Dumuzid. In the standard Akkadian version of the Epic of Gilgamesh, Ishtar asks Gilgamesh to become her consort. When he disdainfully refuses, she unleashes the Bull of Heaven, resulting in the death of Enkidu and Gilgamesh's subsequent grapple with his own mortality.

Inanna's most famous myth is the story of her descent into and return from the ancient Mesopotamian underworld, ruled by her older sister Ereshkigal. After she reaches Ereshkigal's throne room, the seven judges of the underworld deem her guilty and strike her dead. Three days later, Ninshubur pleads with all the gods to bring Inanna back. All of them refuse her, except Enki, who sends two sexless beings to rescue Inanna. Dumuzid is eventually permitted to return to heaven for half the year while his sister Geshtinanna remains in the underworld for the other half, resulting in the cycle of the seasons.

Etymology 

Scholars believe that Inanna and Ishtar were originally separate, unrelated deities, but were conflated with one another during the reign of Sargon of Akkad and came to be regarded as effectively the same goddess under two different names.  Inanna's name may derive from the Sumerian phrase , meaning "Lady of Heaven", but the cuneiform sign for Inanna is not a ligature of the signs lady (cuneiform:  SAL.TUG) and sky (cuneiform:  AN). These difficulties led some early Assyriologists to suggest that Inanna may have originally been a Proto-Euphratean goddess, who was only later accepted into the Sumerian pantheon. This idea was supported by Inanna's youthfulness, as well as the fact that, unlike the other Sumerian divinities, she seems to have initially lacked a distinct sphere of responsibilities. The view that there was a Proto-Euphratean substrate language in Southern Iraq before Sumerian is not widely accepted by modern Assyriologists.

The name Ishtar occurs as an element in personal names from both the pre-Sargonic and post-Sargonic eras in Akkad, Assyria, and Babylonia. It is of Semitic derivation and is probably etymologically related to the name of the West Semitic god Attar, who is mentioned in later inscriptions from Ugarit and southern Arabia. The morning star may have been conceived as a male deity who presided over the arts of war and the evening star may have been conceived as a female deity who presided over the arts of love. Among the Akkadians, Assyrians, and Babylonians, the name of the male god eventually supplanted the name of his female counterpart, but, due to extensive syncretism with Inanna, the deity remained as female, although her name was in the masculine form.

Origins and development

Inanna has posed a problem for many scholars of ancient Sumer due to the fact that her sphere of power contained more distinct and contradictory aspects than that of any other deity. Two major theories regarding her origins have been proposed. The first explanation holds that Inanna is the result of a syncretism between several previously unrelated Sumerian deities with totally different domains. The second explanation holds that Inanna was originally a Semitic deity who entered the Sumerian pantheon after it was already fully structured, and who took on all the roles that had not yet been assigned to other deities.

As early as the Uruk period, Inanna was already associated with the city of Uruk. During this period, the symbol of a ring-headed doorpost was closely associated with Inanna. The famous Uruk Vase (found in a deposit of cult objects of the Uruk III period) depicts a row of naked men carrying various objects, including bowls, vessels, and baskets of farm products, and bringing sheep and goats to a female figure facing the ruler.

Seal impressions from the Jemdet Nasr period show a fixed sequence of symbols representing various cities, including those of Ur, Larsa, Zabalam, Urum, Arina, and probably Kesh. This list probably reflects the report of contributions to Inanna at Uruk from cities supporting her cult. A large number of similar seals have been discovered from phase I of the Early Dynastic period at Ur, in a slightly different order, combined with the rosette symbol of Inanna. These seals were used to lock storerooms to preserve materials set aside for her cult.

Various inscriptions in the name of Inanna are known, such as a bead in the name of King Aga of Kish , or a tablet by King Lugal-kisalsi :

During the Akkadian period, following the conquests of Sargon of Akkad, Inanna and originally independent Ishtar became so extensively syncretized that they became regarded as effectively the same. The Akkadian poet Enheduanna, the daughter of Sargon, wrote numerous hymns to Inanna, identifying her with Ishtar. As a result of this, the popularity of Inanna/Ishtar's cult skyrocketed. Alfonso Archi, who was involved in early excavations of Ebla, assumes Ishtar was originally a goddess venerated in the Euphrates valley, pointing out that an association between her and the desert poplar is attested in the most ancient texts from both Ebla and Mari. He considers her, a moon god (e.g., Sin) and a sun deity of varying gender (Shamash/Shapash) to be the only deities shared between various early Semitic peoples of Mesopotamia and ancient Syria, who otherwise had different not necessarily overlapping pantheons.

Worship

Gwendolyn Leick assumes that during the Pre-Sargonic era, the cult of Inanna was rather limited, though other experts argue that she was already the most prominent deity in Uruk and a number of other political centers in the Uruk period. She had temples in Nippur, Lagash, Shuruppak, Zabalam, and Ur, but her main cult center was the Eanna temple in Uruk, whose name means "House of Heaven" (cuneiform:  E.AN). Some researches assume that the original patron deity of this fourth-millennium BCE city was An.  After its dedication to Inanna, the temple seems to have housed priestesses of the goddess. Next to Uruk, Zabalam was the most important early site of Inanna worship, as the name of the city was commonly written with the signs MUŠ and UNUG, meaning respectively "Inanna" and "sanctuary." It is possible that the city goddess of Zabalam was originally a distinct deity, though one whose cult was absorbed by that of the Urukean goddess very early on. Joan Goodnick Westenholz proposed that a goddess identified by the name Nin-UM (reading and meaning uncertain), associated with Ishtaran in a  hymn, was the original identity of Inanna of Zabalam.

In the Old Akkadian period, Inanna merged with the Akkadian goddess Ishtar, associated with the city of Agade. A hymn from that period addresses the Akkadian Ishtar as "Inanna of the Ulmaš" alongside Inanna of Uruk and of Zabalam. The worship of Ishtar and syncretism between her and Inanna was encouraged by Sargon and his successors, and as a result she quickly became one of the most widely venerated deities in the Mesopotamian pantheon. In inscriptions of Sargon, Naram-Sin and Shar-Kali-Sharri Ishtar is the most frequently invoked deity.

In the Old Babylonian period, her main cult centers were, in addition to aforementioned Uruk, Zabalam and Agade, also Ilip. Her cult was also introduced from Uruk to Kish.

During later times, while her cult in Uruk continued to flourish, Ishtar also became particularly worshipped in the Upper Mesopotamian kingdom of Assyria (modern northern Iraq, northeast Syria and southeast Turkey), especially in the cities of Nineveh, Aššur and Arbela (modern Erbil). During the reign of the Assyrian king Assurbanipal, Ishtar rose to become the most important and widely venerated deity in the Assyrian pantheon, surpassing even the Assyrian national god Ashur. Votive objects found in her primary Assyrian temple indicate that she was a popular deity among women.

Individuals who went against the traditional gender binary were heavily involved in the cult of Inanna. During Sumerian times, a set of priests known as  worked in Inanna's temples, where they performed elegies and lamentations. Men who became  sometimes adopted female names and their songs were composed in the Sumerian  dialect, which, in literary texts, is normally reserved for the speech of female characters. Some Sumerian proverbs seem to suggest that  had a reputation for engaging in anal sex with men. Several Akkadian proverbs seem to suggest that they may have also had homosexual proclivities. Gwendolyn Leick, an anthropologist known for her writings on Mesopotamia, has compared these individuals to the contemporary Indian hijra. In one Akkadian hymn, Ishtar is described as transforming men into women.

Throughout the latter half of the twentieth century, it was widely believed that the cult of Inanna involved a "sacred marriage" ritual, in which a king would establish his legitimacy by taking on the role of Dumuzid and engaging in ritual sexual intercourse with the high priestess of Inanna, who took on the role of the goddess. This view, however, has been challenged and scholars continue to debate whether the sacred marriage described in literary texts involved any kind of physical ritual enactment at all and, if so, whether this ritual enactment involved actual intercourse or merely the symbolic representation of intercourse. The scholar of the ancient Near East Louise M. Pryke states that most scholars now maintain, if the sacred marriage was a ritual that was actually acted out, then it involved only symbolic intercourse.

The cult of Ishtar was long thought to have involved sacred prostitution, but this is now rejected among many scholars. Women across the ancient Near East worshipped Ishtar by dedicating to her cakes baked in ashes (known as ). A dedication of this type is described in an Akkadian hymn. Several clay cake molds discovered at Mari are shaped like naked women with large hips clutching their breasts. Some scholars have suggested that the cakes made from these molds were intended as representations of Ishtar herself.

Iconography

Symbols

Inanna/Ishtar's most common symbol was the eight-pointed star, though the exact number of points sometimes varies. Six-pointed stars also occur frequently, but their symbolic meaning is unknown. The eight-pointed star seems to have originally borne a general association with the heavens, but, by the Old Babylonian Period ( 1830 –  1531 ), it had come to be specifically associated with the planet Venus, with which Ishtar was identified. Starting during this same period, the star of Ishtar was normally enclosed within a circular disc. During later Babylonian times, slaves who worked in Ishtar's temples were sometimes branded with the seal of the eight-pointed star. On boundary stones and cylinder seals, the eight-pointed star is sometimes shown alongside the crescent moon, which was the symbol of Sin (Sumerian Nanna) and the rayed solar disk, which was a symbol of Shamash (Sumerian Utu).

Inanna's cuneiform ideogram was a hook-shaped twisted knot of reeds, representing the doorpost of the storehouse, a common symbol of fertility and plenty. The rosette was another important symbol of Inanna, which continued to be used as a symbol of Ishtar after their syncretism. During the Neo-Assyrian Period (911 – 609 ), the rosette may have actually eclipsed the eight-pointed star and become Ishtar's primary symbol. The temple of Ishtar in the city of Aššur was adorned with numerous rosettes.

Inanna/Ishtar was associated with lions, which the ancient Mesopotamians regarded as a symbol of power. Her associations with lions began during Sumerian times; a chlorite bowl from the temple of Inanna at Nippur depicts a large feline battling a giant snake and a cuneiform inscription on the bowl reads "Inanna and the Serpent", indicating that the cat is supposed to represent the goddess. During the Akkadian Period, Ishtar was frequently depicted as a heavily armed warrior goddess with a lion as one of her attributes.

Doves were also prominent animal symbols associated with Inanna/Ishtar. Doves are shown on cultic objects associated with Inanna as early as the beginning of the third millennium . Lead dove figurines were discovered in the temple of Ishtar at Aššur, dating to the thirteenth century  and a painted fresco from Mari, Syria shows a giant dove emerging from a palm tree in the temple of Ishtar, indicating that the goddess herself was sometimes believed to take the form of a dove.

As the planet Venus
Inanna was associated with the planet Venus, which is named after her Roman equivalent Venus. Several hymns praise Inanna in her role as the goddess or personification of the planet Venus. Theology professor Jeffrey Cooley has argued that, in many myths, Inanna's movements may correspond with the movements of the planet Venus in the sky. In Inanna's Descent to the Underworld, unlike any other deity, Inanna is able to descend into the netherworld and return to the heavens. The planet Venus appears to make a similar descent, setting in the West and then rising again in the East. In Inanna and Shukaletuda, Shukaletuda is described as scanning the heavens in search of Inanna, possibly searching the Eastern and Western horizons. In the same myth, while searching for her attacker, Inanna herself makes several movements that correspond with the movements of Venus in the sky.

Because the movements of Venus appear to be discontinuous (it disappears due to its proximity to the Sun, for many days at a time, and then reappears on the other horizon), some cultures did not recognize Venus as a single entity; instead, they assumed it to be two separate stars on each horizon: the morning and evening star. Nonetheless, a cylinder seal from the Jemdet Nasr period indicates that the ancient Sumerians knew that the morning and evening stars were the same celestial object. The discontinuous movements of Venus relate to both mythology as well as Inanna's dual nature.

Modern astrologers recognize the story of Inanna's descent into the underworld as a reference to an astronomical phenomenon associated with retrograde Venus. Seven days before retrograde Venus makes its inferior conjunction with the sun, it disappears from the evening sky. The seven day period between this disappearance and the conjunction itself is seen as the astronomical phenomenon on which the myth of descent was based. After the conjunction, seven more days elapse before Venus appears as the morning star, corresponding to the ascent from the underworld.

Inanna in her aspect as Anunītu was associated with the eastern fish of the last of the zodiacal constellations, Pisces. Her consort Dumuzi was associated with the contiguous first constellation, Aries.

Character

The Sumerians worshipped Inanna as the goddess of both warfare and love. Unlike other gods, whose roles were static and whose domains were limited, the stories of Inanna describe her as moving from conquest to conquest. She was portrayed as young and impetuous, constantly striving for more power than she had been allotted.

Although she was worshipped as the goddess of love, Inanna was not the goddess of marriage, nor was she ever viewed as a mother goddess. Andrew R. George goes as far as stating that "According to all mythology, 
Ištar was not[...] temperamentally disposed" towards such functions. Julia M. Asher-Greve has even proposed (by Asher-Greve) that Inanna was significant specifically because she was not a mother goddess. As a love goddess, she was commonly invoked by Mesopotamians in incantations.

In Inanna's Descent to the Underworld, Inanna treats her lover Dumuzid in a very capricious manner. This aspect of Inanna's personality is emphasized in the later standard Akkadian version of the Epic of Gilgamesh in which Gilgamesh points out Ishtar's infamous ill-treatment of her lovers. However, according to assyriologist Dina Katz, the portrayal of Inanna's relationship with Dumuzi in the Descent myth is unusual.

Inanna was also worshipped as one of the Sumerian war deities. One of the hymns dedicated to her declares: "She stirs confusion and chaos against those who are disobedient to her, speeding carnage and inciting the devastating flood, clothed in terrifying radiance. It is her game to speed conflict and battle, untiring, strapping on her sandals." Battle itself was occasionally referred to as the "Dance of Inanna". Epithets related to lions in particular were meant to highlight this aspect of her character. As a war goddess she was sometimes referred to with the name Irnina ("victory"), though this epithet could be applied to other deities as well, in addition to functioning as a distinct goddess linked to Ningishzida rather than to Ishtar. Another epithet highlighting this aspect of Ishtar's nature was Anunitu ("the martial one"). Like Irnina, Anunitu could also be a separate deity, and as such she is first attested in documents from the Ur III period.

Assyrian royal curse-formulas invoked both of Ishtar's primary functions at once, invoking her to remove potency and martial valor alike. Mesopotamian texts indicate that traits perceived as heroic (such as a king's ability to lead his troops and to triumph over enemies) and sexual prowess were regarded as interconnected.

While Inanna/Ishtar was a goddess, her gender could be ambiguous at times. Gary Beckman states that "ambiguous gender identification" was a characteristic not just of Ishtar herself but of a category  of deities he refers to as "Ishtar type" goddesses (such as Shaushka, Pinikir or Ninsianna). A late hymn contains the phrase "she [Ishtar] is Enlil, she is Ninil" which might be a reference to occasionally "dimorphic" character of Ishtar, in addition to serving as an exaltation. A hymn to Nanaya alludes to a male aspect of Ishtar from Babylon alongside a variety of more standard descriptions. However, Illona Zsonlany only describes Ishtar as a "feminine figure who performed a masculine role" in certain contexts, for example as a war deity.

Family

Inanna's twin brother was Utu (known as Shamash in Akkadian), the god of the sun and justice. In Sumerian texts, Inanna and Utu are shown as extremely close; some modern authors perceive their relationship as bordering on incestuous. In the myth of her descent into the underworld, Inanna addresses Ereshkigal, the queen of the underworld, as her "older sister", but the two goddesses almost never appear together in Sumerian literature and were not placed in the same category in god lists. Due to Hurrian influence, in some neo-Assyrian sources (for example penalty clauses) Ishtar was also associated with Adad, with the relationship mirroring that between Shaushka and her brother Teshub in Hurrian mythology.

The most common tradition regarded Nanna and his wife Ningal as her parents. Examples of it are present in sources as diverse as a god list from the Early Dynastic period, a hymn of Ishme-Dagan relaying how Enlil and Ninlil bestowed Inanna's powers upon her, a late syncretic hymn to Nanaya, and an Akkadian ritual from Hattusa. While some authors assert that in Uruk Inanna was usually regarded as the daughter of the sky god An, it is possible that references to him as her father are only referring to his status as an ancestor of Nanna and thus his daughter. In literary texts, Enlil or Enki may be addressed as her fathers but references to major gods being "fathers" can also be examples of the use of this word as an epithet indicating seniority.

Dumuzid (later known as Tammuz), the god of shepherds, is usually described as Inanna's husband, but according to some interpretations Inanna's loyalty to him is questionable; in the myth of her descent into the Underworld, she abandons Dumuzid and permits the galla demons to drag him down into the underworld as her replacement. In a different myth, The Return of Dumuzid Inanna instead mourns over Dumuzid's death and ultimately decrees that he will be allowed to return to Heaven to be with her for one half of the year. Dina Katz notes that the portrayal of their relationship in Inanna's Descent is unusual; it does not resemble the portrayal of their relationship in other myths about Dumuzi's death, which almost never pin the blame for it on Inanna, but rather on demons or even human bandits. A large corpus of love poetry describing encounters between Inanna and Dumuzi has been assembled by researchers. However, local manifestations of Inanna/Ishtar were not necessarily associated with Dumuzi. In Kish, the tutelary deity of the city, Zababa (a war god), was viewed as the consort of a local hypostasis of Ishtar, though after the Old Babylonian period Bau, introduced from Lagash, became his spouse (an example of a couple consisting out of a warrior god and a medicine goddess, common in Mesopotamian mythology) and Ishtar of Kish started to instead be worshiped on her own.

Inanna is not usually described as having any offspring, but, in the myth of Lugalbanda and in a single building inscription from the Third Dynasty of Ur ( 2112 –  2004 ), the warrior god Shara is described as her son. She was also sometimes considered the mother of Lulal, who is described in other texts as the son of Ninsun. Wilfred G. Lambert described the relation between Inanna and Lulal as "close but unspecified" in the context of Inanna's Descent. There is also similarly scarce evidence for the love goddess Nanaya being regarded as her daughter (a song, a votive formula and an oath), but it is possible all of these instances merely refer to an epithet indicating closeness between the deities and were not a statement about actual parentage.

Sukkal 

Inanna's sukkal was the goddess Ninshubur, whose relationship with Inanna is one of mutual devotion. In some texts, Ninshubur was listed right after Dumuzi as a member of Inanna's circle, even before some of her relatives; in one text the phrase "Ninshubur, beloved vizier" appears. In another text Ninshubur is listed even before Nanaya, originally possibly a hypostasis of Inanna herself, in a list of deities from her entourage. In an Akkadian ritual text known from Hittite archives Ishtar's sukkal is invoked alongside her family members (Sin, Ningal and Shamash).

Other members of Inanna's entourage frequently listed in god lists were the goddesses Nanaya (usually placed right behind Dumuzi and Ninshubur), Kanisurra, Gazbaba and Bizila, all of them also associated with each other in various configurations independently from this context.

Syncretism and influence on other deities 
In addition to the full conflation of Inanna and Ishtar during the reign of Sargon and his successors, she was syncretised with a large number of deities to a varying degree. The oldest known syncretic hymn is dedicated to Inanna, and has been dated to the Early Dynastic period. Many god lists compiled by ancient scribes contained entire "Inanna group" sections enumerating similar goddesses, and tablet IV of the monumental god list An-Anum (7 tablets total) is known as the "Ishtar tablet" due to most of its contents being the names of Ishtar's equivalents, her titles and various attendants. Some modern researchers use the term Ishtar-type to define specific figures of this variety. Some texts contained references to "all the Ishtars" of a given area.

In later periods Ishtar's name was sometimes used as a generic term ("goddess") in Babylonia, while a logographic writing of Inanna was used to spell the title Bēltu, leading to further conflations. A possible example of such use of the name is also known from Elam, as a single Elamite inscription written in Akkadian  refers to "Manzat-Ishtar," which might in this context mean "the goddess Manzat."

Specific examples 
Ashtart In cities like Mari and Ebla, the Eastern and Western Semitic forms of the name (Ishtar and Ashtart) were regarded as basically interchangeable. However, the western goddess evidently lacked the astral character of Mesopotamian Ishtar. Ugaritic god lists and ritual texts equate the local Ashtart with both Ishtar and Hurrian Ishara.
Ishara Due to association with Ishtar, the Syrian goddess Ishara started to be regarded as a "lady of love" like her (and Nanaya) in Mesopotamia. However, in Hurro-Hittite context Ishara was associated with the underworld goddess Allani instead and additionally functioned as a goddess of oaths.
Nanaya A goddess uniquely closely linked to Inanna, as according to assyriologist Frans Wiggermann her name was originally an epithet of Inanna (possibly serving as an appellative, "My Inanna!"). Nanaya was associated with erotic love, but she eventually developed a warlike aspect of her own too ("Nanaya Euršaba"). In Larsa Inanna's functions were effectively split between three separate figures and she was worshiped as part of a trinity consisting out of herself, Nanaya (as a love goddess) and Ninsianna (as an astral goddess). Inanna/Ishtar and Nanaya were often accidentally or intentionally conflated in poetry.
Ninegal While she was initially an independent figure, starting with Old Babylonian period in some texts "Ninegal" is used as a title of Inanna, and in god lists she was a part of the "Inanna group" usually alongside Ninsianna. An example of the usage of "Ninegal" as an epithet can be found in the text designated as Hymn to Inana as Ninegala (Inana D) in the ETCSL.
Ninisina A special case of syncretism was that between the medicine goddess Ninisina and Inanna, which occurred for political reasons. Isin at one point lost control over Uruk and identification of its tutelary goddess with Inanna (complete with assigning a similar warlike character to her), who served as a source of royal power, was likely meant to serve as a theological solution of this problem. As a result, in a number of sources Ninisina was regarded as analogous to similarly named Ninsianna, treated as a manifestation of Inanna. It is also possible that a ceremony of "sacred marriage" between Ninisina and the king of Isin had been performed as a result. 
Ninsianna A Venus deity of varying gender. Ninsianna was referred to as male by Rim-Sin of Larsa (who specifically used the phrase "my king") and in texts from Sippar, Ur, and Girsu, but as "Ishtar of the stars" in god lists and astronomical texts, which also applied Ishtar's epithets related to her role as a personification of Venus to this deity. In some locations Ninsianna was also known as a female deity, in which case her name can be understood as "red queen of heaven."
Pinikir Originally an Elamite goddess, recognised in Mesopotamia, and as a result among Hurrians and Hittites, as an equivalent of Ishtar due to similar functions. She was identified specifically as her astral aspect (Ninsianna) in god lists.  In a Hittite ritual she was identified by the logogram dIŠTAR and Shamash, Suen and Ningal were referred to as her family; Enki and Ishtar's sukkal were invoked in it as well.  in Elam she was a goddess of love and sex and a heavenly deity ("mistress of heaven").  Due to syncretism with Ishtar and Ninsianna Pinikir was referred to as both a female and male deity in Hurro-Hittite sources.
Šauška Her name was frequently written with the logogram dIŠTAR in Hurrian and Hittite sources, while Mesopotamian texts recognised her under the name "Ishtar of Subartu." Some elements peculiar to her were associated with the Assyrian hypostasis of Ishtar, Ishtar of Nineveh, in later times. Her handmaidens Ninatta and Kulitta were incorporated into the circle of deities believed to serve Ishtar in her temple in Ashur.

Obsolete theories 
Some researchers in the past attempted to connect Ishtar to the minor goddess Ashratu, the Babylonian reflection of West Semitic Athirat (Asherah), associated with Amurru, but as demonstrated by Steve A. Wiggins this theory was baseless, as the sole piece of evidence that they were ever conflated or even just confused with each other was the fact Ishtar and Ashratu shared an epithet – however the same epithet was also applied to Marduk, Ninurta, Nergal, and Suen, and no further evidence can be found in sources such as god lists. There is also no evidence that Athtart (Ashtart), the Ugaritic cognate of Ishtar, was ever confused or conflated with Athirat by the Amorites.

Sumerian texts

Origin myths 
The poem of Enki and the World Order (ETCSL 1.1.3) begins by describing the god Enki and his establishment of the cosmic organization of the universe. Towards the end of the poem, Inanna comes to Enki and complains that he has assigned a domain and special powers to all of the other gods except for her. She declares that she has been treated unfairly. Enki responds by telling her that she already has a domain and that he does not need to assign her one.

The myth of "Inanna and the Huluppu Tree", found in the preamble to the epic of Gilgamesh, Enkidu, and the Netherworld (ETCSL 1.8.1.4), centers around a young Inanna, not yet stable in her power. It begins with a huluppu tree, which Kramer identifies as possibly a willow, growing on the banks of the river Euphrates. Inanna moves the tree to her garden in Uruk with the intention to carve it into a throne once it is fully grown. The tree grows and matures, but the serpent "who knows no charm", the Anzû-bird, and Lilitu (Ki-Sikil-Lil-La-Ke in Sumerian), seen by some as the Sumerian forerunner to the Lilith of Jewish folklore, all take up residence within the tree, causing Inanna to cry with sorrow. The hero Gilgamesh, who, in this story, is portrayed as her brother, comes along and slays the serpent, causing the Anzû-bird and Lilitu to flee. Gilgamesh's companions chop down the tree and carve its wood into a bed and a throne, which they give to Inanna, who fashions a pikku and a mikku (probably a drum and drumsticks respectively, although the exact identifications are uncertain), which she gives to Gilgamesh as a reward for his heroism.

The Sumerian hymn Inanna and Utu contains an etiological myth describing how Inanna became the goddess of sex. At the beginning of the hymn, Inanna knows nothing of sex, so she begs her brother Utu to take her to Kur (the Sumerian underworld), so that she may taste the fruit of a tree that grows there, which will reveal to her all the secrets of sex. Utu complies and, in Kur, Inanna tastes the fruit and becomes knowledgeable. The hymn employs the same motif found in the myth of Enki and Ninhursag and in the later Biblical story of Adam and Eve.

The poem Inanna Prefers the Farmer (ETCSL 4.0.8.3.3) begins with a rather playful conversation between Inanna and Utu, who incrementally reveals to her that it is time for her to marry. She is courted by a farmer named Enkimdu and a shepherd named Dumuzid. At first, Inanna prefers the farmer, but Utu and Dumuzid gradually persuade her that Dumuzid is the better choice for a husband, arguing that, for every gift the farmer can give to her, the shepherd can give her something even better. In the end, Inanna marries Dumuzid. The shepherd and the farmer reconcile their differences, offering each other gifts. Samuel Noah Kramer compares the myth to the later Biblical story of Cain and Abel because both myths center around a farmer and a shepherd competing for divine favor and, in both stories, the deity in question ultimately chooses the shepherd.

Conquests and patronage

Inanna and Enki (ETCSL t.1.3.1) is a lengthy poem written in Sumerian, which may date to the Third Dynasty of Ur (c. 2112  – c. 2004 ); it tells the story of how Inanna stole the sacred mes from Enki, the god of water and human culture. In ancient Sumerian mythology, the mes were sacred powers or properties belonging to the gods that allowed human civilization to exist. Each me embodied one specific aspect of human culture. These aspects were very diverse and the mes listed in the poem include abstract concepts such as Truth, Victory, and Counsel, technologies such as writing and weaving, and also social constructs such as law, priestly offices, kingship, and prostitution. The mes were believed to grant power over all the aspects of civilization, both positive and negative.

In the myth, Inanna travels from her own city of Uruk to Enki's city of Eridu, where she visits his temple, the E-Abzu. Inanna is greeted by Enki's sukkal, Isimud, who offers her food and drink. Inanna starts up a drinking competition with Enki. Then, once Enki is thoroughly intoxicated, Inanna persuades him to give her the mes. Inanna flees from Eridu in the Boat of Heaven, taking the mes back with her to Uruk. Enki wakes up to discover that the mes are gone and asks Isimud what has happened to them. Isimud replies that Enki has given all of them to Inanna. Enki becomes infuriated and sends multiple sets of fierce monsters after Inanna to take back the mes before she reaches the city of Uruk. Inanna's sukkal Ninshubur fends off all of the monsters that Enki sends after them. Through Ninshubur's aid, Inanna successfully manages to take the mes back with her to the city of Uruk. After Inanna escapes, Enki reconciles with her and bids her a positive farewell. It is possible that this legend may represent a historic transfer of power from the city of Eridu to the city of Uruk. It is also possible that this legend may be a symbolic representation of Inanna's maturity and her readiness to become the Queen of Heaven.

The poem Inanna Takes Command of Heaven is an extremely fragmentary, but important, account of Inanna's conquest of the Eanna temple in Uruk. It begins with a conversation between Inanna and her brother Utu in which Inanna laments that the Eanna temple is not within their domain and resolves to claim it as her own. The text becomes increasingly fragmentary at this point in the narrative, but appears to describe her difficult passage through a marshland to reach the temple while a fisherman instructs her on which route is best to take. Ultimately, Inanna reaches her father An, who is shocked by her arrogance, but nevertheless concedes that she has succeeded and that the temple is now her domain. The text ends with a hymn expounding Inanna's greatness. This myth may represent an eclipse in the authority of the priests of An in Uruk and a transfer of power to the priests of Inanna.

Inanna briefly appears at the beginning and end of the epic poem Enmerkar and the Lord of Aratta (ETCSL 1.8.2.3). The epic deals with a rivalry between the cities of Uruk and Aratta. Enmerkar, the king of Uruk, wishes to adorn his city with jewels and precious metals, but cannot do so because such minerals are only found in Aratta and, since trade does not yet exist, the resources are not available to him. Inanna, who is the patron goddess of both cities, appears to Enmerkar at the beginning of the poem and tells him that she favors Uruk over Aratta. She instructs Enmerkar to send a messenger to the lord of Aratta to ask for the resources Uruk needs. The majority of the epic revolves around a great contest between the two kings over Inanna's favor. Inanna reappears at the end of the poem to resolve the conflict by telling Enmerkar to establish trade between his city and Aratta.

Justice myths 

Inanna and her brother Utu were regarded as the dispensers of divine justice, a role which Inanna exemplifies in several of her myths. Inanna and Ebih (ETCSL 1.3.2), otherwise known as Goddess of the Fearsome Divine Powers, is a 184-line poem written by the Akkadian poet Enheduanna describing Inanna's confrontation with Mount Ebih, a mountain in the Zagros mountain range. The poem begins with an introductory hymn praising Inanna. The goddess journeys all over the entire world, until she comes across Mount Ebih and becomes infuriated by its glorious might and natural beauty, considering its very existence as an outright affront to her own authority. She rails at Mount Ebih, shouting:

Inanna petitions to An, the Sumerian god of the heavens, to allow her to destroy Mount Ebih. An warns Inanna not to attack the mountain, but she ignores his warning and proceeds to attack and destroy Mount Ebih regardless. In the conclusion of the myth, she explains to Mount Ebih why she attacked it. In Sumerian poetry, the phrase "destroyer of Kur" is occasionally used as one of Inanna's epithets.

The poem Inanna and Shukaletuda (ETCSL 1.3.3) begins with a hymn to Inanna, praising her as the planet Venus. It then introduces Shukaletuda, a gardener who is terrible at his job. All of his plants die, except for one poplar tree. Shukaletuda prays to the gods for guidance in his work. To his surprise, the goddess Inanna sees his one poplar tree and decides to rest under the shade of its branches. Shukaletuda removes her clothes and rapes Inanna while she sleeps. When the goddess wakes up and realizes she has been violated, she becomes furious and determines to bring her attacker to justice. In a fit of rage, Inanna unleashes horrible plagues upon the Earth, turning water into blood. Shukaletuda, terrified for his life, pleads his father for advice on how to escape Inanna's wrath. His father tells him to hide in the city, amongst the hordes of people, where he will hopefully blend in. Inanna searches the mountains of the East for her attacker, but is not able to find him. She then releases a series of storms and closes all roads to the city, but is still unable to find Shukaletuda, so she asks Enki to help her find him, threatening to leave her temple in Uruk if he does not. Enki consents and Inanna flies "across the sky like a rainbow". Inanna finally locates Shukaletuda, who vainly attempts to invent excuses for his crime against her. Inanna rejects these excuses and kills him. Theology professor Jeffrey Cooley has cited the story of Shukaletuda as a Sumerian astral myth, arguing that the movements of Inanna in the story correspond with the movements of the planet Venus. He has also stated that, while Shukaletuda was praying to the goddess, he may have been looking toward Venus on the horizon.

The text of the poem Inanna and Bilulu (ETCSL 1.4.4), discovered at Nippur, is badly mutilated and scholars have interpreted it in a number of different ways. The beginning of the poem is mostly destroyed, but seems to be a lament. The intelligible part of the poem describes Inanna pining after her husband Dumuzid, who is in the steppe watching his flocks. Inanna sets out to find him. After this, a large portion of the text is missing. When the story resumes, Inanna is being told that Dumuzid has been murdered. Inanna discovers that the old bandit woman Bilulu and her son Girgire are responsible. She travels along the road to Edenlila and stops at an inn, where she finds the two murderers. Inanna stands on top of a stool and transforms Bilulu into "the waterskin that men carry in the desert", forcing her to pour the funerary libations for Dumuzid.

Descent into the underworld

Two different versions of the story of Inanna/Ishtar's descent into the underworld have survived: a Sumerian version dating to the Third Dynasty of Ur (circa 2112  – 2004 ) (ETCSL 1.4.1) and a clearly derivative Akkadian version from the early second millennium . The Sumerian version of the story is nearly three times the length of the later Akkadian version and contains much greater detail.

Sumerian version
In Sumerian religion, the Kur was conceived of as a dark, dreary cavern located deep underground; life there was envisioned as "a shadowy version of life on earth". It was ruled by Inanna's sister, the goddess Ereshkigal. Before leaving, Inanna instructs her minister and servant Ninshubur to plead with the deities Enlil, Nanna, An, and Enki to rescue her if she does not return after three days. The laws of the underworld dictate that, with the exception of appointed messengers, those who enter it may never leave. Inanna dresses elaborately for the visit; she wears a turban, wig, lapis lazuli necklace, beads upon her breast, the 'pala dress' (the ladyship garment), mascara, a pectoral, and golden ring, and holds a lapis lazuli measuring rod. Each garment is a representation of a powerful me she possesses.

Inanna pounds on the gates of the underworld, demanding to be let in. The gatekeeper Neti asks her why she has come and Inanna replies that she wishes to attend the funeral rites of Gugalanna, the "husband of my elder sister Ereshkigal". Neti reports this to Ereshkigal, who tells him: "Bolt the seven gates of the underworld. Then, one by one, open each gate a crack. Let Inanna enter. As she enters, remove her royal garments." Perhaps Inanna's garments, unsuitable for a funeral, along with Inanna's haughty behavior, make Ereshkigal suspicious. Following Ereshkigal's instructions, Neti tells Inanna she may enter the first gate of the underworld, but she must hand over her lapis lazuli measuring rod. She asks why, and is told, "It is just the ways of the underworld." She obliges and passes through. Inanna passes through a total of seven gates, at each one removing a piece of clothing or jewelry she had been wearing at the start of her journey, thus stripping her of her power. When she arrives in front of her sister, she is naked:

Three days and three nights pass, and Ninshubur, following instructions, goes to the temples of Enlil, Nanna, An, and Enki, and pleads with each of them to rescue Inanna. The first three deities refuse, saying Inanna's fate is her own fault, but Enki is deeply troubled and agrees to help. He creates two sexless figures named gala-tura and the kur-jara from the dirt under the fingernails of two of his fingers. He instructs them to appease Ereshkigal and, when she asks them what they want, ask for the corpse of Inanna, which they must sprinkle with the food and water of life. When they come before Ereshkigal, she is in agony like a woman giving birth. She offers them whatever they want, including life-giving rivers of water and fields of grain, if they can relieve her, but they refuse all of her offers and ask only for Inanna's corpse. The gala-tura and the kur-jara sprinkle Inanna's corpse with the food and water of life and revive her. Galla demons sent by Ereshkigal follow Inanna out of the underworld, insisting that someone else must be taken to the underworld as Inanna's replacement. They first come upon Ninshubur and attempt to take her, but Inanna stops them, insisting that Ninshubur is her loyal servant and that she had rightfully mourned for her while she was in the underworld. They next come upon Shara, Inanna's beautician, who is still in mourning. The demons attempt to take him, but Inanna insists that they may not, because he had also mourned for her. The third person they come upon is Lulal, who is also in mourning. The demons try to take him, but Inanna stops them once again.

Finally, they come upon Dumuzid, Inanna's husband. Despite Inanna's fate, and in contrast to the other individuals who were properly mourning her, Dumuzid is lavishly clothed and resting beneath a tree, or upon her throne, entertained by slave-girls. Inanna, displeased, decrees that the galla shall take him. The galla then drag Dumuzid down to the underworld. Another text known as Dumuzid's Dream (ETCSL 1.4.3) describes Dumuzid's repeated attempts to evade capture by the galla demons, an effort in which he is aided by the sun-god Utu.

In the Sumerian poem The Return of Dumuzid, which begins where The Dream of Dumuzid ends, Dumuzid's sister Geshtinanna laments continually for days and nights over Dumuzid's death, joined by Inanna, who has apparently experienced a change of heart, and Sirtur, Dumuzid's mother. The three goddesses mourn continually until a fly reveals to Inanna the location of her husband. Together, Inanna and Geshtinanna go to the place where the fly has told them they will find Dumuzid. They find him there and Inanna decrees that, from that point onwards, Dumuzid will spend half of the year with her sister Ereshkigal in the underworld and the other half of the year in Heaven with her, while his sister Geshtinanna takes his place in the underworld.

Akkadian version
This version had two manuscripts found in the Library of Ashurbanipal and a third was found in Asshur, all dating from the first half of the first millennium before the common era. Of the Ninevite version, the first cuneiform version was published in 1873 by François Lenormant, and the transliterated version was published by Peter Jensen in 1901. Its title in Akkadian is Ana Kurnugê, qaqqari la târi.

The Akkadian version begins with Ishtar approaching the gates of the underworld and demanding the gatekeeper to let her in:

The gatekeeper (whose name is not given in the Akkadian version) hurries to tell Ereshkigal of Ishtar's arrival. Ereshkigal orders him to let Ishtar enter, but tells him to "treat her according to the ancient rites". The gatekeeper lets Ishtar into the underworld, opening one gate at a time. At each gate, Ishtar is forced to shed one article of clothing. When she finally passes the seventh gate, she is naked. In a rage, Ishtar throws herself at Ereshkigal, but Ereshkigal orders her servant Namtar to imprison Ishtar and unleash sixty diseases against her.

After Ishtar descends to the underworld, all sexual activity ceases on earth. The god Papsukkal, the Akkadian counterpart to Ninshubur, reports the situation to Ea, the god of wisdom and culture. Ea creates an androgynous being called Asu-shu-namir and sends them to Ereshkigal, telling them to invoke "the name of the great gods" against her and to ask for the bag containing the waters of life. Ereshkigal becomes enraged when she hears Asu-shu-namir's demand, but she is forced to give them the water of life. Asu-shu-namir sprinkles Ishtar with this water, reviving her. Then, Ishtar passes back through the seven gates, receiving one article of clothing back at each gate, and exiting the final gate fully clothed.

Interpretations in modern assyriology

Dina Katz, an authority on Sumerian afterlife beliefs and funerary customs, considers the narrative of Inanna's descent to be a combination of two distinct preexisting traditions rooted in broader context of Mesopotamian religion.

In one tradition, Inanna was only able to leave the underworld with the help of Enki's trick, with no mention of the possibility of finding a substitute. This part of the myth belongs to the genre of myths about deities struggling to obtain power, glory etc. (such as Lugal-e or Enuma Elish), and possibly served as a representation of Inanna's character as a personification of a periodically vanishing astral body. According to Katz, the fact that Inanna's instructions to Ninshubur contain a correct prediction of her eventual fate, including the exact means of her rescue, show that the purpose of this composition was simply highlighting Inanna's ability to traverse both the heavens and the underworld, much like how Venus was able to rise over and over again. She also points out Inanna's return has parallels in some Udug-hul incantations.

Another was simply one of the many myths about the death of Dumuzi (such as Dumuzi's Dream or Inana and Bilulu; in these myths Inanna is not to blame for his death), tied to his role as an embodiment of vegetation. She considers it possible that the connection between the two parts of the narrative was meant to mirror some well attested healing rituals which required a symbolic substitute of the person being treated.

Katz also notes that the Sumerian version of the myth is not concerned with matters of fertility, and points out any references to it (e.g. to nature being infertile while Ishtar is dead) were only added in later Akkadian translations; so was the description of Tammuz's funeral. The purpose of these changes was likely to make the myth closer to cultic traditions linked to Tammuz, namely the annual mourning of his death followed by celebration of a temporary return. According to Katz it is notable that known many copies of the later versions of the myth come from Assyrian cities which were known for their veneration of Tammuz, such as Ashur and Nineveh.

Other interpretations
A number of less scholarly interpretations of the myth arose through the 20th century, many of them rooted in the tradition of Jungian analysis rather than assyriology. Some authors draw comparisons to the Greek myth of the abduction of Persephone as well.

Monica Otterrmann performed a feminist interpretation of the myth, questioning its interpretation as related to the cycle of nature, claiming that the narratives represent that Inanna's powers were being restricted by the Mesopotamian patriarchy, due to the fact that, according to her, the region was not conducive to fertility. Brandão questions this idea in part, for although Inanna's power is at stake in the Sumerian text, in the Akkadian text the goddess' relationship to fertility and fertilization is at stake. Furthermore, in the Sumerian text Inanna's power is not limited by a man, but by another equally powerful goddess, Ereskigal.

Later myths

Epic of Gilgamesh

In the Akkadian Epic of Gilgamesh, Ishtar appears to Gilgamesh after he and his companion Enkidu have returned to Uruk from defeating the ogre Humbaba and demands Gilgamesh to become her consort. Gilgamesh refuses her, pointing out that all of her previous lovers have suffered:

Infuriated by Gilgamesh's refusal, Ishtar goes to heaven and tells her father Anu that Gilgamesh has insulted her. Anu asks her why she is complaining to him instead of confronting Gilgamesh herself. Ishtar demands that Anu give her the Bull of Heaven and swears that if he does not give it to her, she will "break in the doors of hell and smash the bolts; there will be confusion [i.e., mixing] of people, those above with those from the lower depths. I shall bring up the dead to eat food like the living; and the hosts of the dead will outnumber the living."

Anu gives Ishtar the Bull of Heaven, and Ishtar sends it to attack Gilgamesh and his friend Enkidu. Gilgamesh and Enkidu kill the Bull and offer its heart to the sun-god Shamash. While Gilgamesh and Enkidu are resting, Ishtar stands up on the walls of Uruk and curses Gilgamesh. Enkidu tears off the Bull's right thigh and throws it in Ishtar's face, saying, "If I could lay my hands on you, it is this I should do to you, and lash your entrails to your side." (Enkidu later dies for this impiety.)  Ishtar calls together "the crimped courtesans, prostitutes and harlots" and orders them to mourn for the Bull of Heaven. Meanwhile, Gilgamesh holds a celebration over the Bull of Heaven's defeat.

Later in the epic, Utnapishtim tells Gilgamesh the story of the Great Flood, which was sent by the god Enlil to annihilate all life on earth because the humans, who were vastly overpopulated, made too much noise and prevented him from sleeping. Utnapishtim tells how, when the flood came, Ishtar wept and mourned over the destruction of humanity, alongside the Anunnaki. Later, after the flood subsides, Utnapishtim makes an offering to the gods. Ishtar appears to Utnapishtim wearing a lapis lazuli necklace with beads shaped like flies and tells him that Enlil never discussed the flood with any of the other gods. She swears him that she will never allow Enlil to cause another flood and declares her lapis lazuli necklace a sign of her oath. Ishtar invites all the gods except for Enlil to gather around the offering and enjoy.

Song of Agushaya 

The Song of Agushaya, an Akkadian text presumably from the time of Hammurapi, tells a myth mixed with hymnic passages: the war goddess Ishtar is filled with constant wrath and plagues the earth with war and battle. With her roar, she finally even threatens the wise god Ea in Apsû. He appears before the assembly of gods and decides (similar to Enkidu in the Epic of Gilgameš) to create an equal opponent for Ishtar. From the dirt of his fingernails he forms the powerful goddess Ṣaltum ("fight, quarrel"), whom he instructs to confront Ishtar disrespectfully and plague her day and night with her roar. The text section with the confrontation of both goddesses is not preserved, but it is followed by a scene in which Ishtar demands from Ea to call Ṣaltum back, which he does. Subsequently, Ea establishes a festival in which henceforth a "whirl dance" (gūštû) is to be performed annually in commemoration of the events. The text ends with the statement that Ishtar's heart has calmed down.

Other tales
A myth about the childhood of the god Ishum, viewed as a son of Shamash, describes Ishtar seemingly temporarily taking care of him, and possibly expressing annoyance at that situation.

In a pseudepigraphical Neo-Assyrian text written in the seventh century , but which claims to be the autobiography of Sargon of Akkad, Ishtar is claimed to have appeared to Sargon "surrounded by a cloud of doves" while he was working as a gardener for Akki, the drawer of the water. Ishtar then proclaimed Sargon her lover and allowed him to become the ruler of Sumer and Akkad.

In Hurro-Hittite texts the logogram dISHTAR denotes the goddess Šauška, who was identified with Ishtar in god lists and similar documents as well and influenced the development of the late Assyrian cult of Ishtar of Nineveh according to hittitologist Gary Beckman. She plays a prominent role in the Hurrian myths of the Kumarbi cycle.

Later influence

In antiquity

The cult of Inanna/Ishtar may have been introduced to the Kingdom of Judah during the reign of King Manasseh and, although Inanna herself is not directly mentioned in the Bible by name, the Old Testament contains numerous allusions to her cult.  and  mention "the Queen of Heaven", who is probably a syncretism of Inanna/Ishtar and the West Semitic goddess Astarte. Jeremiah states that the Queen of Heaven was worshipped by women who baked cakes for her.

The Song of Songs bears strong similarities to the Sumerian love poems involving Inanna and Dumuzid, particularly in its usage of natural symbolism to represent the lovers' physicality.   mentions Inanna's husband Dumuzid under his later East Semitic name Tammuz, and describes a group of women mourning Tammuz's death while sitting near the north gate of the Temple in Jerusalem. Marina Warner (a literary critic rather than Assyriologist) claims that early Christians in the Middle East assimilated elements of Ishtar into the cult of the Virgin Mary. She argues that the Syrian writers Jacob of Serugh and Romanos the Melodist both wrote laments in which the Virgin Mary describes her compassion for her son at the foot of the cross in deeply personal terms closely resembling Ishtar's laments over the death of Tammuz. However, broad comparisons between Tammuz and other dying gods are rooted in the work of James George Frazer and are regarded as a relic of less rigorous early 20th century Assyriology by more recent publications.

The cult of Inanna/Ishtar also heavily influenced the cult of the Phoenician goddess Astarte. The Phoenicians introduced Astarte to the Greek islands of Cyprus and Cythera, where she either gave rise to or heavily influenced the Greek goddess Aphrodite. Aphrodite took on Inanna/Ishtar's associations with sexuality and procreation. Furthermore, she was known as Ourania (Οὐρανία), which means "heavenly", a title corresponding to Inanna's role as the Queen of Heaven.

Early artistic and literary portrayals of Aphrodite are extremely similar to Inanna/Ishtar. Aphrodite was also a warrior goddess; the second-century AD Greek geographer Pausanias records that, in Sparta, Aphrodite was worshipped as Aphrodite Areia, which means "warlike". He also mentions that Aphrodite's most ancient cult statues in Sparta and on Cythera showed her bearing arms. Modern scholars note that Aphrodite's warrior-goddess aspects appear in the oldest strata of her worship and see it as an indication of her Near Eastern origins. Aphrodite also absorbed Ishtar's association with doves, which were sacrificed to her alone. The Greek word for "dove" was peristerá, which may be derived from the Semitic phrase peraḥ Ištar, meaning "bird of Ishtar". The myth of Aphrodite and Adonis is derived from the story of Inanna and Dumuzid.

Classical scholar Charles Penglase has written that Athena, the Greek goddess of wisdom and war, resembles Inanna's role as a "terrifying warrior goddess". Others have noted that the birth of Athena from the head of her father Zeus could be derived from Inanna's descent into and return from the Underworld. However, as noted by Gary Beckman, a rather direct parallel to Athena's birth is found in the Hurrian Kumarbi cycle, where Teshub is born from the surgically split skull of Kumarbi, rather than in any Inanna myths.

In Mandaean cosmology, one of the names for Venus is ʿStira, which is derived from the name Ishtar.

Anthropologist Kevin Tuite argues that the Georgian goddess Dali was also influenced by Inanna, noting that both Dali and Inanna were associated with the morning star, both were characteristically depicted nude, (but note that Assyriologists assume the "naked goddess" motif in Mesopotamian art in most cases cannot be Ishtar, and the goddess most consistently depicted as naked was Shala, a weather goddess unrelated to Ishtar) both were associated with gold jewelry, both sexually preyed on mortal men, both were associated with human and animal fertility, (note however that Assyriologist Dina Katz pointed out the references to fertility are more likely to be connected to Dumuzi than Inanna/Ishtar in at least some cases) and both had ambiguous natures as sexually attractive, but dangerous, women.

Traditional Mesopotamian religion began to gradually decline between the third and fifth centuries AD as ethnic Assyrians converted to Christianity. Nonetheless, the cult of Ishtar and Tammuz managed to survive in parts of Upper Mesopotamia. In the tenth century AD, an Arab traveler wrote that "All the Sabaeans of our time, those of Babylonia as well as those of Harran, lament and weep to this day over Tammuz at a festival which they, more particularly the women, hold in the month of the same name."

Worship of Venus deities possibly connected to Inanna/Ishtar was known in Pre-Islamic Arabia right up until the Islamic period. Isaac of Antioch (d. 406 AD) says that the Arabs worshipped 'the Star' (kawkabta), also known as Al-Uzza, which many identify with Venus. Isaac also mentions an Arabian deity named Baltis, which according to Jan Retsö most likely was another designation for Ishtar. In pre-Islamic Arabian inscriptions themselves, it appears that the deity known as Allat was also a Venusian deity. Attar, a male god whose name is a cognate of Ishtar's, is a plausible candidate for the role of Arabian Venus deity too on the account of both his name and his epithet "eastern and western."

Modern relevance

In his 1853 pamphlet The Two Babylons, as part of his argument that Roman Catholicism is actually Babylonian paganism in disguise, Alexander Hislop, a Protestant minister in the Free Church of Scotland, incorrectly argued that the modern English word Easter must be derived from Ishtar due to the phonetic similarity of the two words. Modern scholars have unanimously rejected Hislop's arguments as erroneous and based on a flawed understanding of Babylonian religion. Nonetheless, Hislop's book is still popular among some groups of evangelical Protestants and the ideas promoted in it have become widely circulated, especially through the Internet, due to a number of popular Internet memes.

Ishtar had a major appearance in Ishtar and Izdubar, a book-length poem written in 1884 by Leonidas Le Cenci Hamilton, an American lawyer and businessman, loosely based on the recently translated Epic of Gilgamesh. Ishtar and Izdubar expanded the original roughly 3,000 lines of the Epic of Gilgamesh to roughly 6,000 lines of rhyming couplets grouped into forty-eight cantos. Hamilton significantly altered most of the characters and introduced entirely new episodes not found in the original epic. Significantly influenced by Edward FitzGerald's Rubaiyat of Omar Khayyam and Edwin Arnold's The Light of Asia, Hamilton's characters dress more like nineteenth-century Turks than ancient Babylonians. In the poem, Izdubar (the earlier misreading for the name "Gilgamesh") falls in love with Ishtar, but, then, "with hot and balmy breath, and trembling form aglow", she attempts to seduce him, leading Izdubar to reject her advances. Several "columns" of the book are devoted to an account of Ishtar's descent into the Underworld. At the conclusion of the book, Izdubar, now a god, is reconciled with Ishtar in Heaven. In 1887, the composer Vincent d'Indy wrote Symphony Ishtar, variations symphonique, Op. 42, a symphony inspired by the Assyrian monuments in the British Museum.

Inanna has become an important figure in modern feminist theory because she appears in the male-dominated Sumerian pantheon, but is equally as powerful, if not more powerful than, the male deities she appears alongside. Simone de Beauvoir, in her book The Second Sex (1949), argues that Inanna, along with other powerful female deities from antiquity, have been marginalized by modern culture in favor of male deities. Tikva Frymer-Kensky has argued that Inanna was a "marginal figure" in Sumerian religion who embodies the "socially unacceptable" archetype of the "undomesticated, unattached woman". Feminist author Johanna Stuckey has argued against this idea, pointing out Inanna's centrality in Sumerian religion and her broad diversity of powers, neither of which seem to fit the idea that she was in any way regarded as "marginal". Assyriologist Julia M. Asher-Greve, who specializes in the study of position of women in antiquity,  criticizes Frymer-Kensky's studies of Mesopotamian religion as a whole, highlighting the problems with her focus on fertility, the small selection of sources her works relied on, her view that position of goddesses in the pantheon reflected that of ordinary women in society (so-called "mirror theory"), as well as the fact her works do not accurately reflect the complexity of changes of roles of goddesses in religions of ancient Mesopotamia. Ilona Zsolnay regards Frymer-Kensky's methodology as faulty.

In Neopaganism and Sumerian reconstructionism
Inanna's name is also used to refer to the Goddess in modern Neopaganism and Wicca. Her name occurs in the refrain of the "Burning Times Chant", one of the most widely used Wiccan liturgies. Inanna's Descent into the Underworld was the inspiration for the "Descent of the Goddess", one of the most popular texts of Gardnerian Wicca.

Paul Thomas, a scholar of new religious movements, has criticized the modern portrayal of Inanna, accusing it of anachronistically imposing modern gender conventions on the ancient Sumerian story, portraying Inanna as a wife and mother, two roles the ancient Sumerians never ascribed to her, while ignoring the more masculine elements of Inanna's cult, particularly her associations with warfare and violence. Gary Beckman, a researcher of religions of ancient Near East, calls neopagan authors "not revivalists, but inventors,"  and notes that they often incorrectly "view all historically attested female divinities as full or partial manifestations of a single figure," and highlights that while Ishtar did overshadow many other deities, she was never a "single Goddess."

In popular culture 
 Features as Gilgamesh's archenemy and a huntress in SMITE (2014) under her Ishtar name.
 Inanna appears as separate and playable Archer-class, Rider-class, and Avenger-class Servants in Fate/Grand Order (2015), under her Ishtar name. Her Avenger-class form is later revealed to be Astarte (stylized in-game as Ashtart), sharing a similar form as Ishtar.
 Inanna appears as “Ishtar” as a persona in Persona 5.

Dates (approximate)

See also 
 Anat
 Nana (Bactrian goddess)
 Rati
 Isis
 Star of Ishtar

Notes

References

Bibliography

Further reading

External links

 World History Encyclopedia https://www.worldhistory.org/ishtar/

 
Akkadian Empire
Ancient LGBT history
Characters in the Epic of Gilgamesh
Deities in the Hebrew Bible
Fertility goddesses
Justice goddesses
Life-death-rebirth goddesses
Love and lust deities
Love and lust goddesses
Mesopotamian goddesses
Stellar goddesses
Uruk period
Venusian deities
War goddesses
Queens of Heaven (antiquity)
Divine twins
Lion deities
Katabasis